BMC Cancer is a peer-reviewed open access medical journal that publishes original research on cancer and oncology.  It was established in 2001 and is published by BioMed Central.

Abstracting and indexing 
The journal is abstracted and indexed by PubMed, MEDLINE, CAS, EMBASE, Scopus, Current Contents, and CABI. According to the Journal Citation Reports, its 2-year impact factor was 4.430 in 2020.

References

External links 

 

BioMed Central academic journals
Oncology journals
Publications established in 2001
English-language journals
Creative Commons Attribution-licensed journals